Samuel Harris (June 14, 1814 – June 25, 1899) was the fifth president of Bowdoin College and the first to be an alumnus.  After having left Bowdoin in 1871, he went on to teach at Yale Divinity School for 25 years.

Career

Harris was born in East Machias, Maine on June 14, 1814 and attended Washington Academy in the same town. After having graduated from Bowdoin in 1833, he attended Andover Theological Seminary in Massachusetts.  Harris had been a pastor in Conway, Massachusetts and Pittsfield, Massachusetts from 1841 to 1855 and had taught at the Divinity School in Bangor, Maine before becoming president of Bowdoin in 1867.  Having lived in Maine throughout the American Civil War, he was considered by many as a candidate for the United States Senate.  Nevertheless, Harris resigned from his position at Bowdoin in 1871 after having grown tired of such activities as fund-raising.

In the same year, he began working at Yale as the Dwight Professor of Systematic Theology.  There, he wrote much more often, especially in the 1880s when he published his first major work, The Philosophical Basis of Theism, which received notice from England to Japan.  Additionally, God the Creator and Lord of All explained his doctrinal system and he had been writing an unfinished book at the time of his death.  When he resigned in 1895, he was given the title of Professor Emeritus.  He continued to lecture at the school for an additional two years before permanently retiring.

He died at his summer home in Litchfield, Connecticut on June 25, 1899.

Published works

Lectures
 The Kingdom of Christ on Earth (1875)
 The Philosophical Basis of Theism (1888)
 The Self-Revelation of God
 God the Creator and Lord of All

References

External links
Samuel, Harris Administrative Records
JSTOR: Church History, Vol. 26, No. 1 (March., 1957), pp. 74-75

1814 births
1899 deaths
Presidents of Bowdoin College
Bowdoin College alumni
People from Bangor, Maine
People from East Machias, Maine
Bangor Theological Seminary faculty
Yale Divinity School faculty
People from Conway, Massachusetts
People from Pittsfield, Massachusetts
Academics from Maine